The Hillary Step was a nearly vertical rock face with a height of around  located near the summit of Mount Everest, about  above sea level. Located on the southeast ridge, halfway between the "South Summit" and the true summit, the Hillary Step was the most technically difficult part of the typical Nepal-side Everest climb and the last real challenge before reaching the top of the mountain. The rock face was destroyed by an earthquake that struck the region in 2015.

Climbing the Hillary Step had the danger of a  drop on the right (when going up) and an  drop on the left. An unaided climb was rated as a Class 4 rock climb—but in the death zone. One expedition noted that climbing the Hillary Step was "strenuous" but did offer some protection from the elements.

In some climbing seasons after heavy snowfall, the rock face could be bypassed with snow/ice climbing.

Anatoli Boukreev found a body hanging from ropes at the base of the step in 1996, according to his book The Climb.

Climbing 
The step was named after Sir Edmund Hillary, who was the first known person, along with Tenzing Norgay, to scale it on the way to the summit during the  1953 British Mount Everest Expedition. Hillary and Tenzing first climbed the Hillary Step on 29 May 1953 by climbing the crack between the snow and the rock. Hillary reported that the snow on the step was harder than at lower elevation. Hillary wrote in 1953:
After an hour’s steady going we reached the foot of the most formidable-looking problem on the ridge – a rock step some forty feet [12 m] high. We had known of the existence of this step from aerial photographs, and had also seen it through our binoculars from Thyangboche. We realised that at this altitude it might well spell the difference between success and failure. The rock itself, smooth and almost holdless, might have been an interesting Sunday afternoon problem for a group of expert rock climbers in the Lake District, but here it was a barrier beyond our feeble strength to overcome. I could see no way of turning it on the steep rock bluff on the west, but fortunately another possibility of tackling it still remained. On its east side was another great cornice, and running up the full forty feet [12 m] of the step was a narrow crack between the cornice and the rock. Leaving Tenzing to belay me as best he could, I jammed my way into this crack, then kicking backwards with my crampons I sank their spikes deep into the frozen snow behind me and levered myself off the ground. Taking advantage of every little rock hold and all the force of knee, shoulder and arms I could muster, I literally cramponed backwards up the crack, with a fervent prayer that the cornice would remain attached to the rock. Despite the considerable effort involved, my progress although slow was steady, and as Tenzing paid out the rope I inched my way upwards until I could finally reach over the top of the rock and drag myself out of the crack on to a wide  ledge. For a few moments I lay regaining my breath and for the first time really felt the fierce determination that nothing now could stop us from reaching the top. I took a firm stand on the ledge and signalled to Tenzing to come on up. As I heaved hard on the rope Tenzing wriggled his way up the crack and finally collapsed exhausted at the top like a giant fish when it has just been hauled from the sea after a terrific struggle.

The reference to being hauled up like a fish rankled with Tenzing, and the "fish" simile disappeared from later accounts.

In 1953, the step was seen by the first assault party of Tom Bourdillon and Charles Evans when they reached the South Summit on 26 May at 13:00, too late to attempt the summit. Seated on the snow dome, they could look closely at the last  ascent to the summit. It was not the gentle snow ridge they had hoped for, but a thin crest of snow and ice on rock, steep on the left, overhanging as a cornice on the right. It was interrupted by a formidable-looking  rock step two-thirds of the way up.

In more recent years, the ascent and descent over the Step were generally made with the assistance of fixed ropes, usually placed there by the first ascending team of the season. In a good climbing situation, it was about a two-hour climb from the South Summit to the Hillary Step, one to two hours to climb the cliff, and then another 20 minutes from the top of the Hillary Step to the summit of Mount Everest. Only one climber at a time could traverse it. With increasing numbers of people climbing the mountain, the Step frequently became a bottleneck, with climbers forced to wait for their turn on the ropes and thereby slowing the flow of people up and down the mountain.

Before 2015, the descending sequence along Everest's southeast ridge was:
 Summit of Everest
 Final slope to summit
 Hillary Step  rock cliff
 Cornice traverse (knife-edge ridge)
 South Summit of Everest
 The Balcony

2015 alteration 
It was suspected in 2016 that the April 2015 Nepal earthquake had altered the Hillary Step, but there was so much snow it was not clear whether it had truly changed. Kenton Cool wrote that the Hillary Step "is only 12 to 15 feet [3.7 to 4.6 m] high." In May 2017, Tim Mosedale and other climbers reported that "the Hillary Step is no more", although the full extent and interpretation of the changes were still nascent. Another climber who thought the Step changed by 2016 was six-time Everest summiter David Liaño Gonzalez, who summited in 2013 and 2016, when the relevant changes are reported to have occurred. However, some important Nepalese climbers, including Ang Tshering Sherpa, chairman of the Nepal Mountaineering Association, reported that the Step was still intact but covered in more snow than before. Later in the year, after seeing a large exhibition of photos from 2006 to 2016, he did agree that at least the upper portion of the step had indeed changed.

Peter Hillary, Edmund Hillary's son, was asked his opinion about the Step based on photos. He agreed it was there in part, but seemed to think it had undergone some sort of a change, noting especially what looked like a fresh broken rock. By early June 2017, more reports and photographic evidence came in, with Garrett Madison reporting that the step had conclusively changed. Dave Hahn, who has climbed Everest 15 times, was shown photos and agreed that it was changed. A special kind of mourning hit the community with realization of missing rocks and freshly hewn scars of new coloured rock at this landmark feature. Hahn noted how it was a great tribute to Hillary and Tenzing and he thought of them whenever he scrambled over it.

Later in 2017, mountaineering guide Lhakpa Rangdu mounted a photo exhibition at the Nepal Tourism Board showing how the Hillary Step area had changed. Rangdu has climbed Everest multiple times since 2005, including before and after the big Nepal earthquake, and he is a trained photographer. The combination of these skills—high-altitude photography and mountaineering—allowed him to provide a photographic history of the Hillary Step, and he has said that it is indeed gone.

See also
1953 British Mount Everest Expedition 
Mount Everest in 2017
Hillary Montes (Also named after Edmund Hillary)
Hillary Peak
Aiguille du Dru (2005 rock-fall ended climbing of Bonatti route)
Aoraki / Mount Cook (2013 rock-fall shortened mountain)
Three Steps

References

External links

 Rock and Ice - The Hillary Step: Gone, Altered, or Simply Hidden? (May 2017)
Link to a picture of the Hillary Step feature (circa 2008)
Part way down is picture from on it looking up
Helmet cam near step at around 1:30

Mount Everest
2015 Nepal earthquakes
Edmund Hillary